The Verdict is a 1925 American silent mystery film directed by Fred Windemere and starring Lou Tellegen, Louise Lorraine, and Gertrude Astor.

Plot
As described in a film magazine review, Jimmy is tried and convicted of murder based upon circumstantial evidence after the shooting of Ronsard, an admirer of Jimmy's sweetheart Carol. After a second trial, where Jimmy is proved innocent, the Butler confesses having shot the man in self-defense on the night the young woman was dining quietly with Ronsard. Bookkeeper Jimmy's accounts had come up short, and Ronsard had promised to help if she would dine there.

Cast

References

Bibliography
 Munden, Kenneth White. The American Film Institute Catalog of Motion Pictures Produced in the United States, Part 1. University of California Press, 1997.

External links

1925 films
1925 mystery films
1920s English-language films
American silent feature films
American mystery films
American black-and-white films
Films directed by Fred Windemere
Silent mystery films
1920s American films